Good Charamel Records is an indie record label based in Buffalo, New York started by Robby Takac, founding member of the American Rock band Goo Goo Dolls (Bassist and Vocals) in 2003. Specializing in female fronted Japanese rock bands, the label began signing and releasing music in North America for local Buffalo bands as well as releasing compilations and charity discs in the Western New York area. As a result of a 2006 tour of Japan with the Good Charamel act The Juliet Dagger a relationship was struck between the legendary Osaka pop punk band Shonen Knife and Good Charamel Records, Good Charamel hosted Shonen Knife's tour of America with The Juliet Dagger and Verona Grove in 2007. In 2009 Good Charamel released Shonen Knife's "Super Group" album and began signing other Japanese rock acts, then releasing and producing music and DVDs by Japanese artists exclusively.

Artists

Current
Shonen Knife

Pinky Doodle Poodle

MOLICE

DJ Sashimi

Former
LAZYgunsBRISKY (Japan)

TsuShiMaMiRe (Japan)

Last Conservative

The Juliet Dagger

KLEAR

Terry Sullivan

Damien Simon

Agent Me

Jim Kurdziel / Matt Bergman (Comedy)

Amungus

Discography

External links
 www.goodcharamel.com

American independent record labels
Indie rock record labels